The Europe is a one-person dinghy designed in Belgium in 1960 by Alois Roland as a class legal Moth dinghy. The design later changed into its own one-design class.

The dinghy is ideal for sailors weighing 50–85 kilos. The hull is made of fibre glass and weighs 45 kg, fully rigged 60 kg. The dinghy is tapering in the stem and round in the bottom. The sail is made of dacron. The mast is made of carbon fibre and specially designed to the sailor. A soft mast is best for light sailors, while heavier sailors use stiffer masts. Sails are also specially designed according to mast stiffness and crew weight.

The Europe was introduced as an Olympic class in the 1992 Summer Olympics as the women's single-handed dinghy. It was replaced by the Laser Radial in the 2008 Summer Olympics.

Since 2008 the Europe is one of the Vintage Yachting Classes at the Vintage Yachting Games.

Events

Olympic Games

Asian Games Women's

Pan American Games Women's

World Championship

Open

Men

Women

Continental Championships

European Championship Women's

European Championship Men's

European Championship Open Master

European Championship Women's Youth

European Championship Men's Youth

Vintage Yachting Games

Women's

Men's

See also
Europe World Championships

References

External links

US Class Website 
International Europe Class Union Website

 
Classes of World Sailing
Dinghies
Olympic sailing classes
1960s sailboat type designs
Sailboat type designs by Belgian designers